Tesarius is a genus of aphodiine dung beetles in the family Scarabaeidae. There are about five described species in Tesarius.

Species
These five species belong to the genus Tesarius:
 Tesarius caelatus (Leconte, 1857)
 Tesarius doyeni (Cartwright, 1977)
 Tesarius mcclayi (Cartwright, 1955)
 Tesarius oregonensis (Cartwright, 1955)
 Tesarius sulcipennis (Lea, 1904)

References

Further reading

External links

 

Scarabaeidae
Articles created by Qbugbot